The women's 4 × 100 metre medley relay event at the 2018 Commonwealth Games was held on 10 April at the Gold Coast Aquatic Centre.

Records
Prior to this competition, the existing world and Commonwealth Games records were as follows.

The following records were established during the competition:

Results
The final was held at 21:43.

References

Women's 4 x 100 metre medley relay
Commonwealth Games
Common